Arctosa rubicunda is a species of wolf spider in the family Lycosidae. It is found in the USA and Canada.

References

Further reading

External links

 

rubicunda
Spiders described in 1877